The following lists events that happened during 2006 in Chile.

Incumbents
President of Chile: Ricardo Lagos (until 11 March), Michelle Bachelet (starting 11 March)

Events

January
15 January – A runoff is held for the 2005–06 Chilean presidential election.
20 January – 2006 Copiapó mining accident

May
30 May – 790,000 students protest across the country in the 2006 student protests in Chile.

December
28 December – Pension Reserve Fund of Chile is established.

Deaths
13 June – Stella Díaz Varín (born 1926)
14 August – Rubén Marcos (born 1942)
10 November – Gabriel Donoso (born 1960)
25 November – Leocán Portus (born 1923)
10 December – Augusto Pinochet (born 1915)

References 

 
Years of the 21st century in Chile
Chile